Severny is a rural locality (a settlement) in Susolovskoye Rural Settlement, Velikoustyugsky District, Vologda Oblast, Russia. The population was 464 as of 2002. There are 10 streets.

Geography 
Severny is located 63 km east of Veliky Ustyug (the district's administrative centre) by road. Khimzavod is the nearest rural locality.

References 

Rural localities in Velikoustyugsky District